Kimpton Hotel Monaco Washington DC is a 183-room high end boutique hotel at the corner of 7th and F Streets Northwest in the Penn Quarter neighborhood of Washington, D.C. Kimpton Hotel Monaco DC is one of ten Kimpton hotel properties in the Washington Metropolitan Area and is located across the street from the National Portrait Gallery and the Capital One Arena. The hotel opened in the summer of 2002 and was named one of the eighty best new hotels in the world in 2003 by Condé Nast Traveler. In September 2010, Pebblebrook Hotel Trust acquired the Monaco Washington DC hotel for $74.0 million.

Architecture
Kimpton Hotel Monaco DC is located inside the neoclassical General Post Office building, a National Historic Landmark constructed in 1839 that was the first all-marble building in Washington and patterned after the Roman Temple of Jupiter. The hotel, listed on the Historic Hotels of America, occupies an entire city block between 7th and 8th, and E and F streets. The four-story building is separated by a courtyard. One half of the structure was designed by Robert Mills, designer of the Washington Monument, while the other half was designed by Thomas U. Walter, one of the architects for the United States Capitol.

Kimpton began a $32 million renovation of the General Post Office Building in 2000 after an agreement with the General Services Administration to lease the building for 60 years. The main post office area was transformed into the hotel lobby and the mail-sorting pavilion became the restaurant.

Room design
The hotel rooms feature vaulted 12–18 ft (3.7-5.5 m) ceilings and long windows. The color scheme of each room is eclectic. The drapes are charcoal and white patterned, the walls are yellow, lounge chairs are periwinkle blue, chandeliers are lime green, and damask pillows are a mixture of orange and red.  A bust of Thomas Jefferson, the third President of the United States and a good friend of Robert Mills, sits on top of a neoclassic armoire in each room. In addition to standard rooms and suites, the hotel features "Tall Rooms" with 18-foot ceilings, 96-inch (244 cm) beds, and raised showerheads. First floor rooms are mostly below ground with only small windows near the ceiling letting in sunlight. The second through fourth floor exterior rooms face the city, while the interior rooms face the courtyard and restaurant. Each guest is given a complimentary goldfish at check-in which hotel staff feed and maintain during the guest's stay.

Restaurant
Hotel Monaco's restaurant and bar, Dirty Habit, features a glass-walled atrium and a large outdoor patio. It shares its name and design with a hotel restaurant in San Francisco. The restaurant is accessible through an entrance in the hotel lobby and a second entrance on 8th Street that was once a carriageway passage for horses and buggies.

When the hotel opened in 2002, the original restaurant was Poste Moderne Brasserie, which closed in 2016. Poste was known for its sustainable practices and organic garden, and it was the 2009 Mayor's Environmental Excellence Award Winner for Outstanding Achievement by a Restaurant. In 2008, Poste was recognized as the Upscale Casual Restaurant of the Year by the Restaurant Association of Metropolitan Washington. In 2014, First Lady Michelle Obama celebrated her 50th birthday in a private room at Poste.

Guest Services
Fruit water is provided at check-in in addition to a complimentary coffee bar in the mornings in the lobby until 10 am. For travelers checking in after noon, freshly baked cookies are offered at the front desk around 3 pm. A happy hour is hosted in the lobby for guests from 4-5 pm daily.

Gallery

References

External links
 Kimpton Hotel Monaco Washington DC
 Dirty Habit DC

Hotel Monaco
Kimpton hotels
Hotels in Washington, D.C.
Hotel Monaco
Hotel Monaco
Hotels established in 2002
Hotel Monaco